The Graeco-Roman Museum is an archaeological museum located in Alexandria, Egypt.

History 
Erected in 1892, it was first built in a five-room apartment, inside one small building on Rosetta Street (later Avenue Canope and now Horriya). In 1895, it was transferred to another, larger building near Gamal Abdul Nasser Street. Its first director was Giuseppe Botti. From 1904 to 1932 he was followed by Evaristo Breccia and then Achille Adriani.

The museum contains several pieces dating from the Greco-Roman (Ptolemaic) era in the 3rd century BC, such as a sculpture of Apis in black granite, the sacred bull of the Egyptians, mummies, sarcophagus, tapestries, and other objects offering a view of Greco-Roman civilization in contact with ancient Egypt.

The museum's collection is the product of donations from wealthy Alexandrians as well as of excavations led by successive directors of the institution, both within the town and in its environs. Certain other objects have come from the Organization of Antiquities at Cairo (particularly those of the Pharaonic period) and from various digs undertaken at the beginning of the century in Fayoum and at Benhasa. Housed within a historic building whose beautiful neoclassical facade of six columns and pediment bears the large Greek inscription ‘MOYΣEION’ ("MOUSEION"). The museum consists of 27 halls and an attractive garden, which offer an excellent introduction to Egypt's Greco-Roman period.

The museum has been closed for renovations since 2005. As of June 2017, the building was still surrounded by scaffolding. In February 2022 the Secretary-General of the Supreme Council of Antiquities, Mostafa Waziri, said that the museum would be opened within a few months.

Directors of the Greco-Roman Museum 

 1892–1903, Giuseppe Botti
 1904–1932, Evaristo Breccia
 Achille Adriani
 2004–2010, Mervat Seif el-Din

Gallery

See also 
 Museums in Alexandria

References

External links
 Supreme Council of Antiquities Museums: The Graeco-Roman Museum

1892 establishments in Egypt
Archaeological museums in Egypt
Egyptological collections in Egypt
Museums established in 1892
Museums in Alexandria
Museums of ancient Greece
Museums of ancient Rome